Conor Stakelum  (born 2 August 1993) is a retired Irish figure skater. He is the 2017 FBMA Trophy silver medalist and a five-time Irish national champion (2014–2018).

Competitive highlights 
GP: Grand Prix; CS: Challenger Series; JGP: Junior Grand Prix

References

1993 births
Irish figure skaters
Living people